Sultan Krym-Girei (21 November 1876 – 28 March 1918) was an Imperial Russian military officer and a member of the former ruling family of the Crimean Khanate. 

In 1905 he was asked by Illarion Vorontsov-Dashkov, newly appointed Viceroy of the Caucasus, to lead a delegation to negotiate with the Republic of Guria in modern Georgia.

References

1876 births
1918 deaths
People from Teuchezhsky District
Politicians of the Russian Empire
Russian people of World War I
1900s in Georgia (country)